The Juris were a tribe of South American Indigenous people, formerly occupying the country between the rivers Içá (lower Putumayo) and Yapura, north-western Brazil. In ancient days they were the most powerful tribe of the district, but in 1820 their numbers did not exceed 2000. Owing to inter-marrying, the Juris are believed to have been extinct for half a century. They were closely related to the Passes, and were like them a fair-skinned, finely built people with quite European features.

References

Ethnic groups in Brazil